This is a list of Māori  (canoes). The information in this list represents a compilation of different oral traditions from around New Zealand. These accounts give several different uses for the waka: many carried Polynesian migrants and explorers from Hawaiki to New Zealand; others brought supplies or made return journeys to Hawaiki;  was said to be lost at sea.

List of waka

See also
Waka (canoe)
Māori migration canoes 
List of Māori iwi
Lists of marae in New Zealand

References

 
Waka
Polynesian navigation